Alexandre Dréan, or simply Dréan, (12 November 1884 – 8 March 1977) was a 20th-century French actor and singer.

His interpretation of the operetta Phi-Phi in 1920 made him popular.

His best-known songs are Cache ton piano and Elle s'était fait couper les cheveux.

Filmography 
 1913: Le Fils de Lagardère : Passepoil
 1930: Bon appétit, messieurs
 1931: The Man in Evening Clothes
 1931: When Do You Commit Suicide?
 1931: Delphine : Papillon
 1932: Le Vendeur du Louvre : Le vendeur
 1932: Aces of the Turf : Papillon
 1932: A Star Disappears : Claudius
 1932: 
 1933: Rivaux de la piste : Paradis
 1933: Le Cas du docteur Brenner
 1934: The Bread Peddler : Cricri
 1936: Les Frères Delacloche
 1952: The Nude Dancer : Gallus
 1953: Soyez les bienvenus
 1959: Le Gendarme de Champignol : le docteur
 1962: Un cheval pour deux : le voisin

External links 
 Alexandre Dréan on Data.bnf.fr
 
 Brève biographie
 Dréan sur lesgensducinema.com

Male actors from Marseille
1884 births
1977 deaths
20th-century French male singers